The Bold and the Beautiful is an American television soap opera. It was first broadcast on March 23, 1987, and airs on CBS. The following is a list of characters that first appeared or will appear in the soap in 2014, by order of first appearance. All characters are introduced by the series' executive producer and head writer Bradley Bell.

Ivy Forrester

Ivy Forrester, portrayed by Ashleigh Brewer, made her first appearance on July 10, 2014. In May 2014, it was announced that Australian actress Brewer had joined the cast of The Bold and the Beautiful in the role of Ivy Forrester. She began filming for the series on May 24, 2014, and initially signed a three-year contract with the show. Brewer told a writer for Soap Opera Digest that during her first meeting she had a successful chemistry read with Wyatt Spencer (Darin Brooks) and the producers decided to create a character with her. Brewer explained that Ivy was originally going to be American, before being changed to Australian and then English. After the producers had another think about it, they decided that she should be Australian. In January 2018, Brewer announced her departure from the role of Ivy; she cited her decision to focus on her acting career as her reason for leaving.

Ivy is Eric Forrester's (John McCook) niece and the younger daughter of John Forrester and his second wife, Claire Forrester. She is the half-sister of Jessica Forrester through John's first marriage to Maggie Forrester. She arrives in Los Angeles, after she is brought in to work for the new jewelry design collection, Hope for the Future (HFTF) by Eric and Rick Forrester (Jacob Young) replacing Quinn Fuller (Rena Sofer).

After Liam Spencer's failed relationship with Hope Logan, Ivy and Liam began a relationship, though have to deal with the brief return of Liam's ex-wife Steffy Forrester. Steffy's actress, Jacqueline MacInnes Wood, noted that "in Steffy's mind, Ivy is just some new woman in town and Liam is fair game. He and Ivy have no history". Liam breaks up with Ivy at her cousin Alexandria Forrester's funeral to pursue a future with Steffy. Ivy then dates Liam's brother Wyatt Spencer. Ivy and Wyatt get more serious despite her attraction to and interference by Steffy's brother Thomas Forrester. Ivy accepts Wyatt's marriage proposal but privately tells Liam that she is still in love with him, which is overheard by Wyatt's mother Quinn. Quinn tells Wyatt his fiancée really wants Liam and after initially denying it Ivy and Liam both admit the Ivy's lingering feelings for Liam.

John Forrester

John Forrester, played by comedian Fred Willard, made his first screen appearance on October 2, 2014. John had previously been mentioned on-screen by other characters, but never seen. Willard's casting was announced on August 25, 2014, and he began filming on August 27. He will appear in four episodes. John is the older brother of Eric Forrester (John McCook) and the father of newcomer Ivy Forrester (Ashleigh Brewer). John came to visit Ivy and Eric, while he was in the United States. Michael Logan from TV Guide reported that John is "a traveling salesman-inventor and quite the party boy".

For his portrayal of John, Willard was nominated and won for Outstanding Special Guest Performer in a Drama Series at the 42nd Daytime Emmy Awards.

Others

References

External links
Characters and cast at the Official The Bold and the Beautiful website 
Characters and cast at the Internet Movie Database

, 2014
, Bold and the Beautiful